Wacław Józef Świerzawski (14 May 1927 – 7 October 2017) was a Roman Catholic bishop and professor.

Świerzawski was born in Złoczów, Poland (now Zolochiv, Ukraine). He was ordained to the priesthood on 11 December 1949; he would receive a master's degree in theology from Jagiellonian University and one in canon law from the Academy of Catholic Theology in Warsaw, in addition to a doctorate from the College of Sant'Anselmo in 1968. He would be appointed associate professor of the Pontifical Faculty of Theology in 1981 and full professor in 1988. He would serve as Chair of Homiletics at the Metropolitan Seminary of Kraków between 1975 and 1986.

He served as bishop of the Diocese of Sandomierz from 28 April 1992 to October 2002 and would pass away on 7 October 2017; his funeral was held on 15 and 16 October. During his life, Świerzawski would author 64 books and over 1,300 articles regarding theology.

References

1927 births
2017 deaths
People from Zolochiv, Lviv Oblast
20th-century Roman Catholic bishops in Poland
21st-century Roman Catholic bishops in Poland